The Long County Courthouse is located in Ludowici, Georgia and is in the Neoclassical style.  It was built in 1926 and the interior was renovated in 1974.  It is made of brick and has a two-story portico with Tuscan columns. It is the first courthouse for Long County, which was created in 1920.  It is located on Georgia State Route 99.  It was added to the National Register of Historic Places in 1980.

References

External links
 

Courthouses on the National Register of Historic Places in Georgia (U.S. state)
National Register of Historic Places in Long County, Georgia
Neoclassical architecture in Georgia (U.S. state)
Government buildings completed in 1926
Long County, Georgia